John Joseph Lyons (21 March 1914 – 16 June 1993) was an Australian rules footballer who played with Hawthorn in the Victorian Football League (VFL).

Notes

External links 

1914 births
1993 deaths
Australian rules footballers from Victoria (Australia)
Hawthorn Football Club players
Mines Rovers Football Club players